The EMD G8 is a model of diesel-electric locomotive of which 382 were built between 1954 and 1965 for both export and domestic use. They were built by both Electro-Motive Division in the United States and by General Motors Diesel Division in Canada for use in ten countries, being equipped to operate on several different track gauges.

Overview

The G8 was built for use in Australia, Canada, Brazil, Cuba, Egypt, Indonesia, Iran, South Korea, Liberia, and New Zealand (DB class). The 1967 Israeli invasion of Sinai captured Egyptian G8 number 3256, which became Israel Railways number 251.

The G8 was also built in Australia under licence by Clyde Engineering, with Victorian Railways purchasing a total of 89 between 1955 and 1969, with later variants including a redesigned cab, carbody and radiator (the G8B) and those built after 1967 (the G18B) equipped with the newer EMD 645 engine rather than the EMD 567 which had been fitted to the earlier locomotives. They were designated as the T class.

BHP also purchased two G8s, classed as the DE class, for service on its mine railways in the Middleback Ranges, South Australia. Both locomotives also saw service on the Coffin Bay Tramway out of Port Lincoln.

The Clyde units differed from the North American-built ones in having a shunter's refuge on the No. 2 end.

See also 
List of GM-EMD locomotives
List of GMD Locomotives

References

External links

victorianrailways.net T class page Includes schematic diagram and original October 1954 VR Newsletter article on the G8 locomotive.

G08
G08
G08
A1A-A1A locomotives
B-B locomotives
Narrow gauge locomotives
Railway locomotives introduced in 1954
 
Diesel-electric locomotives of Brazil
Diesel-electric locomotives of Canada
Diesel-electric locomotives of Cuba
Diesel-electric locomotives of Egypt
Diesel-electric locomotives of Israel
Diesel-electric locomotives of Indonesia
Diesel-electric locomotives of Iran
Diesel-electric locomotives of Liberia
Diesel-electric locomotives of New Zealand
Diesel-electric locomotives of South Korea
Six-Day War
Standard gauge railway locomotives